Hrvatski košarkaški klub Grude, commonly referred to as HKK Grude or simply Grude, is a basketball team from the town of Grude, Bosnia and Herzegovina. Formed in 1976, the club currently competes in the A1 Herzeg Bosnia League.

History 
HKK Grude was formed in 1976, by basketball fans in the town of Grude. Soon after foundation, the club formed a youth squad and a female team.

Honours
Herzeg-Bosnia League:
Winners (4): 2005, 2011, 2016, 2018
Runner-Up (1): 2021

Fans 
HKK Grude does not have an official fan group. Most of the club supporters come from the west Herzegovina region. A small fan group called Uncuti supports the club.

Current roster

References

External links

Team profile at Eurobasket.com

Basketball teams established in 1976
Basketball teams in Bosnia and Herzegovina
Basketball teams in Yugoslavia
Croatian sports clubs outside Croatia